The St. Petersburg Saints were a minor league baseball team that operated out of St. Petersburg, Florida. The team began as a semi-pro team and as early as October 1908, the semi-pro Saints played the Cincinnati Reds in a post-season exhibition game. By 1914, the Saints were receiving regular coverage in the local press. They played in the Florida State League from 1920–1928 and then folded operations. A second team, also called the St.Petersburg Saints played in the Florida International League from 1947–1954 and the Florida State League from 1955–1965. The team won four championships and were owned by R. Vernon and Irene C. Eckert from 1951–1954.

Affiliations

They were affiliated with Cleveland in 1949, the New York Yankees from 1956–1961, and Los Angeles Dodgers from 1962–1965. The team name was changed to the St. Petersburg Cardinals upon their signing an affiliation deal with the St. Louis Cardinals in 1966. They continued as the Cards through 1996, winning four more championships. The team was renamed once more in 1997 as the St. Petersburg Devil Rays (an affiliation deal with the Tampa Bay Devil Rays, now the Tampa Bay Rays) and remained operation until folding for good after the 2000 season when the Devil Rays affiliated with the Advanced Single-A Bakersfield Blaze for the 2001 season.

Legacy

On June 23, 2007, the Tampa Bay Devil Rays wore 1955 St. Petersburg Saints uniforms in a turn back the clock game against the Dodgers. Rays coach Don Zimmer had played on the 1955 World Series champion Brooklyn Dodgers and the Rays honored the 1955 team and Zimmer.

Notable alumni

Hall of Fame alumni

 Sparky Anderson (1966, MGR) Inducted, 2000
 Jimmie Foxx (1947, Player/MGR) Inducted, 1951

Notable alumni

 Luis Alicea (1990)
 Wilson Alvarez (1998, 2000) MLB All-Star
 Jack Billingham (1962, 1964) MLB All-Star
 Pedro Borbon (1967)
 Miguel Cairo (1996)
 Bill Caudill (1975) MLB All-Star
 Mark Clark (1990)
 Reggie Cleveland (1967)
Rhéal Cormier (1989)
 José Cruz (1967) 2 x MLB All-Star
 Jody Davis (1980) 2 x MLB All-Star
 John Denny (1971) 1976 NL ERA Leader; 1983 NL Cy Young Award
 Mike Difelice (1992-1993)
 Leon Durham (1977) 2 x MLB All Star
 Jeff Fassero (1986)
 Mike Gallego (1996)
Jim Gott (1980)
 Juan Guzman (2000) MLB All-Star; 1996 AL ERA Leader
 Keith Hernandez (1972) 5 x MLB All-Star; 1979 NL Batting Title; 1979 NL Most Valuable Player
 Larry Herndon (1973)
 Tom Herr (1976-1977) MLB All-Star
 Ken Hill (1987) MLB All-Star
 Danny Jackson (1996) 2 x MLB All-Star
 Lance Johnson (1985) MLB All-Star
Brian Jordan (1989-1990) MLB All-Star
 Felix Jose (1992) MLB All-Star
 Terry Kennedy (1977) (1993, MGR) 4 x MLB All-Star
 Lon Kruger College Basketball coach
 Joe Magrane (1985, 1992) 1988 NL ERA Leader
 Matt Morris (1995) 2 x MLB All-Star
 Willie Montanez (1967) MLB All-Star
Mike Morgan (1996) MLB All-Star
Jerry Mumphrey (1972) MLB All-Star
 Ken Oberkfell (1975)
 Terry Pendleton (1982) MLB All-Star; 1991 NL Batting Title; 1991 NL Most Valuable Player
 Placido Polanco (1996) 2 x MLB All-Star
 Chris Sabo (1993) 3 x MLB All-Star; 1988 NL Rookie of the Year
 Tom Tresh (1958) 3 x MLB All-Star; 1962 AL Rookie of the Year
 Garry Templeton (1974-1975) 3 x MLB All-Star
 Jose Uribe (1981)
 Andy Van Slyke (1981) MLB All-Star
 Todd Worrell (1984) 3 x MLB All-Star; 1986 NL Rookie of the Year
Esteban Yan (1999)
 Dmitri Young (1993) 2 x MLB All-Star

References

External links
Baseball Reference

Defunct minor league baseball teams
Defunct Florida State League teams
Sports in St. Petersburg, Florida
Los Angeles Dodgers minor league affiliates
Tampa Bay Devil Rays minor league affiliates
St. Louis Cardinals minor league affiliates
New York Yankees minor league affiliates
Cleveland Guardians minor league affiliates
2000 disestablishments in Florida
Defunct baseball teams in Florida
1920 establishments in Florida
Baseball teams established in 1920
Sports clubs disestablished in 2000